Eugenie Marian Duggan (1872 – 2 November 1936) was a popular Australian stage actress. She was the sister of the actors Edmund, P.J. and Kathleen Duggan. She began studying acting, won a number of elocution competitions and made her professional debut in 1890 in Romeo and Juliet.

She joined the company of theatre entrepreneur William Anderson, and later married him. She played a wide range of roles throughout Australia and New Zealand, including the title part in the original 1907 production of The Squatter's Daughter. In 1911 she appeared in the short film of The Christian as Glory Quayle. In 1920 she toured with her own company, the Eugenie Duggan Company. She later retired from acting and established a drama school. She and Anderson had one child, a daughter, Mary, but were separated at the time of her death on 2 November 1936.

Select theatrical credits
Cyrano de Bergerac
East Lynne
Oliver Twist
The Silver King (1898)
A Woman of Pleasure
The Work Girl 
A Sailor's Sweetheart
Honor Thy Father
Mariners of England
Night Birds of London
Between Two Women (1904)
Camille (1905)
A Girl's Cross Roads
Human Nature
The Female Swindler (1905)
The Ladder of Life 
The Squatter's Daughter (1907)
Man to Man (1908)
Hamlet, Prince of Denmark (1909)
The Winning Ticket (1910)
The Chance of a Lifetime (1910)
The Christian (1911)
My Mate (1911)
When London Sleeps (1912)
The Girl of the Never Never (1912)
The Confession (1913)
The Little Girl God Forgot (1920)

References

External links
 Eugenie Duggan profile, Ausstage.edu; accessed 28 November 2014.

1872 births
1936 deaths
Irish emigrants to colonial Australia
Australian silent film actresses
19th-century Australian actresses
20th-century Australian actresses
Date of birth missing
Place of birth missing
Australian Shakespearean actresses
Actresses from Melbourne